Victims of the Night is a 1997 studio album by Detroit metal band Halloween.

Production 1986-1997

Victims of the Night was intended to be a follow up to the successful Don't Metal with Evil record. The album was recorded in 1986 in Ann Arbor, Michigan. Originally, the tracks "Candles" and "Come and Get It" were originally recorded for the album. Only 11 songs made it on to the album.

Track listing

Personnel
Brian Thomas – vocals
Rick Craig – guitar
George Neal – bass
Bill Whyte – drums

Additional musicians
Scott Schuster – keyboards
Rob Tyner – backing vocals

References

External links
Official Halloween website

Halloween (band) albums
1997 albums